The 2021 Drake Bulldogs football team represented Drake University as a member of the Pioneer Football League (PFL) during 2021 NCAA Division I FCS football season. Led by third-year head coach Todd Stepsis, the Bulldogs compiled an overall record of 2–9 with a mark of 1–7 in conference play, tying for ninth place in the PFL. The team played its home games at Drake Stadium in Des Moines, Iowa.

The 2021 Drake Bulldogs football team represented Drake University in the 2021 NCAA Division I FCS football season. The Bulldogs competed as members of the Pioneer Football League and were led by third-year head coach Todd Stepsis. They played their home games at Drake Stadium in Des Moines, Iowa.

Previous season

The Bulldogs finished the 2020–21 season with 2–3 overall record and 2–3 in conference record to finish in fifth place in the PFL.

Preseason
The Pioneer League released their preseason coaches' poll on July 27. The Bulldogs were picked to finish in third place.

Schedule

Roster

Game summaries

vs. West Virginia Wesleyan

at #11 Montana State

at #11 North Dakota (Potato Bowl USA)

vs. Valparaiso

at Butler

vs. Dayton

at San Diego

vs. Stetson

at Marist

vs. St. Thomas (MN)

at Davidson

References

Drake
Drake Bulldogs football seasons
Drake Bulldogs football